Mirugaa is a 2021 Tamil-language action thriller film directed by Parthiban and produced by Vinod Jain. The film stars Srikanth and Raai Laxmi. Produced by Jaguar Studios, it was released on 5 March 2021. The film received mixed reviews from critics who criticized the screenplay, VFX, predictability and execution.

Synopsis
John, a.k.a. Aravind, a serial killer who hunts rich, single mothers, kills their relatives who stay in her house  and loots their money. In one such endeavour, Subadhra, a neighbour, witnesses his heinous crime and begins to blackmail him with a video recording. Subadhra coerces Aravind into infiltrating her sister Lakshmi's estate, to extort money, before killing Lakshmi and her family. However, upon realising how rich Lakshmi is, Aravind concocts a new plan. This makes up the intriguing plotline of the film..

Cast

Production 
Srikanth and Raai Laxmi began working on the film in December 2018, teaming up for a "graphics-heavy" film written by noted cinematographer M. V. Panneerselvam and directed by debutant J. Parthiban. The film was shot throughout 2019 in cities including Pollachi, Munnar, Thalaikona, Ooty and Kodaikanal. The climax was shot in Mani Mahal in Chennai. The makers promoted the film by revealing that a tiger would play a pivotal role. A first look poster was released online in May 2019.

The film's trailer was released by actor Dhanush, Arya, Vijay Antony and Bharath on 5 February 2021.

Release 
The film was released across theatres in Tamil Nadu on 5 March 2021. A critic from Times of India wrote, "The attempt to hold the attention of viewers with a tiger in the film's pre-climax and climax portions is laudable, but the below par VFX couldn't do justice to it". A critic from Cinema Express noted the film has a "predictable screenplay, poor execution, budgetary limitations and unfeasible VFX technology, which hinder this serial killer film". Dinamalar gave the film a mixed review, concluding that the film was a missed opportunity.

References

External links 
 

2021 films
2021 action thriller films
2020s Tamil-language films
Indian action thriller films